Akçay Dam is a dam in Turkey. It is on Akçay River which is a tributary of Sakarya River. 

It is situated in Gölpazarı ilçe (district) of Bilecik Province at  close to Softalar village. It is a rockfill dam. The dam has recently been completed. After water holding phase,  of agricultural land will be irrigated.

References

Dams in Bilecik Province
Gölpazarı District
Dams completed in 2016